Jack Palmer is a comic character created in 1974 by René Pétillon. He is a goofy private detective. His satirical adventures touch various social subjects: politics, the media, the mafia, the jet set, etc.

The series ran from 1974 until 2013.

Albums 
Pétillon, Éditions du Fromage, 1976. Renamed in Gourous, derviches et co. in 1979, in Une sacrée salade in 1981
Mister Palmer et Docteur Supermarketstein, Éditions du fromage, 1977
La Dent creuse, Éditions du fromage, 1978
Les Disparus d'Apostrophes !, Dargaud, 1982 
Le chanteur de Mexico, Dargaud, 1984 
Le Prince de la BD, Dargaud, 1985 
Le Pékinois, Dargaud, 1987 
Un détective dans le Yucca, Albin Michel, 1989 
Narco-dollars, Albin Michel, 1990 
Un privé dans la nuit, Albin Michel, 1993 
Le Top-model, Albin Michel, 1995. Renamed L'Affaire du top-model in 2001 
L'Enquête corse, Albin Michel, 2000 
L'Affaire du voile, Albin Michel, 2006 
Enquête au paradis, Dargaud, 2009 
Palmer en Bretagne, Dargaud, 2013

Special issue:
 Le Meilleur et le pire de Jack Palmer, Albin Michel, 1999

Adaptations 
 List of films based on French-language comics
 The Corsican File (L'Enquête corse)
 List of TV series based on French-language comics

References 

French comics titles
1974 comics debuts
2013 comics endings
Bandes dessinées
Crime comics
Detective comics
Humor comics
Satirical comics
Comics adapted into television series
Comics adapted into animated series
French comics adapted into films
Comics characters introduced in 1974
French comics characters
Male characters in comics
Fictional private investigators